James Newton "Jesse" Duryea (September 7, 1859 – August 19, 1942) was a pitcher in Major League Baseball for six seasons. He made his big league debut for Cincinnati Red Stockings as a 29-year-old on April 20, 1889. He came to stay in Cincinnati for another three years, later with the Reds, until he was released in July 1892 and joined Washington Senators. He however played three games with St. Louis Browns the year earlier. During his 13 days long spell at St. Louis, he received his nickname "Cyclone Jim" by Ted Sullivan for his pitching abilities. He played his last MLB game for Washington Senators on July 15, 1893.

References

External links

1859 births
1942 deaths
Major League Baseball pitchers
Cincinnati Red Stockings (AA) players
Cincinnati Reds players
St. Louis Browns (AA) players
Washington Senators (1891–1899) players
19th-century baseball players
Baseball players from Iowa
St. Paul Freezers players
St. Paul Saints (Northwestern League) players
St. Paul Apostles players
Binghamton Bingoes players
Allentown Buffaloes players
Minneapolis Minnies players
Rochester Browns players
Minneapolis Millers (baseball) players
St. Paul Saints (Western League) players
People from Mitchell County, Iowa